= Luwa =

Swiss ventilation technology company

- Company type: Joint-stock company
- Industry: Ventilation and air-conditioning technology
- Founded: 1935 in Zürich, Switzerland
- Founder: Hans Bechtler, Walter Bechtler
- Fate: Country subsidiaries sold; Swiss operations largely acquired by Aare Tessin AG (Atel)
- Headquarters: Zürich, Switzerland
- Products: Ventilation and heating technology, textile air and air-conditioning systems, filter technology, process engineering equipment
- Number of employees: 2,665 (group, 1998)
- Parent: Hesta Holding (from 1976); Zellweger Luwa AG (from 1993)

Luwa was a Swiss company based in Zürich that specialized in ventilation and air-conditioning technology. Founded in 1935 by Hans and Walter Bechtler, it became a leading firm in textile air and air-conditioning systems with a worldwide production and distribution network.

== History ==
In 1935 Hans and Walter Bechtler founded Luwa AG in Zürich—the name formed from Lu(ft) and Wä(rme), German for "air" and "heat"—to sell ventilation and heating technology. Its breakthrough into an industrial enterprise came during the Second World War with the production and distribution of air-raid ventilation systems and gas-mask filters. Still during the war, the company moved into textile air and air-conditioning technology, in which it became the leading firm after 1946, with a worldwide production and distribution organization. At the same time Luwa developed process engineering products (thin-film evaporators, spray dryers) and was active in the manufacture of components.

The effects of the 1973 oil crisis led to staff reductions and rationalization, reorganization, and a paring down of products; in 1983 the company concentrated on textile air, air-conditioning, and filter technology. The relocation of the textile industry to Asia brought new sales difficulties.

In 1976 Luwa became part of the Hesta Holding controlled by the Bechtler family, and in 1993, within this holding, Luwa was integrated into Zellweger Luwa AG. From 2005 the individual country subsidiaries were sold, with the main part of the Swiss company (excluding the textile division) taken over by Aare Tessin AG (Atel).

The Luwa group employed 9 people in 1935, about 60 in 1940, 700 in 1956, and 2,665 in total in 1998. Its turnover was 7.9 million francs in 1949, rising to 556 million francs for the group in 1998.

== Bibliography ==
- D. Zimmermann, Luwa 1935–1985, 1986
